This is the list of presidents of Alsace since 1974. Regional legislatures are directly elected since 1986.

References

Politics of Alsace
Lists of French politicians